The ferilla or firilla is a traditional fishing boat from Malta. It bears similarities to the dgħajsa, but it is of stronger construction. The ferilla developed in the 17th century and it was common until about 1900. Some examples of this boat type still exist but they are rare.

History
The fishing boat which came to be known as the ferilla developed in the 17th century. At the time, it does not seem to have had a specific name, and the term ferilla referred to a type of small passenger boat which operated between Birgu and Senglea. By the 19th century, the fishing boat became known as the ferilla.

The ferilla tended to remain relatively close to land, initially due to fear of Barbary pirates. It was the most popular type of boat used by Maltese fishermen until around 1900. A few examples still survive in Marsaxlokk, St. Paul's Bay and possibly Gozo. There have been attempts to make replicas of this type of boat out of fibreglass.

The boat also participated in the annual rowing regatta held in the Grand Harbour on 8 September from 1822 until it was replaced by the frejgatina in 1935.

Description
The ferilla bears many similarities to the dgħajsa tal-pass, but it was more sturdy since it was not confined to sheltered harbours. It has a taller forestem and a higher freeboard than the dgħajsa. The bows of the ferilla usually depict the Eye of Horus.

The boats have removable washboards.

References

Boat types
Types of fishing vessels
Maltese culture
Maritime history of Malta